Dr. Fayaz Ahmad Malik is an Indian pharmacologist, cancer biologist and a scientist at the Indian Institute of Integrative Medicine of the Council of Scientific and Industrial Research. He is known for his studies on investigating the regulatory mechanisms of Cancer Stem Cells during tumor metastasis. His studies also involve the identification of signaling networks conferring resistance to current anti-cancer therapies. His discovery of new anticancer agents holds a number of patents for the processes he has developed. The Department of Biotechnology of the Government of India awarded him the National Bioscience Award for Career Development, one of the highest Indian science awards, for his contributions to Biosciences, in 2014.

The Department of Science and Technology (DST) of the Government of India awarded him the Swaranajayanti Fellowship, one of the prestigious Fellowship awards, for his advanced research in cancer biology, in 2013-14. Council of Scientific and Industrial Research felicitated him with CSIR-Young Scientist Award (CSIR-YSA) in 2009. In 2010 Government of Jammu and Kashmir also awarded him with Young Scientist Award in Biological Sciences.

Biography 
Fayaz Malik, after securing a master's degree in biotechnology and a PhD,. He started his career by joining the Indian Institute of Integrative Medicine of the Council of Scientific and Industrial Research where he is a senior scientist of the Cancer Research and Drug Discovery group. His major research focus remains to understand the critical regulatory biological mechanisms predisposed to the failure of current therapies, acquired resistance, and the onset of metastasis by exploring cellular catabolic machinery and regulatory networks of Cancer Stem Cells in subtypes of breast cancer. He has also developed many processes for which he holds the patents. His studies have been documented by way of a number of articles and Google Scholar, an online repository of scientific articles has listed 70 of them. Besides, he has contributed chapters to books published by others. He has also participated in various seminars and conferences to give invited speeches.

Awards and honors 
Malik received the Young Scientist of Year Award from the Council of Scientific and Industrial Research in 2009 and Young Scientist Awards from Jammu and Kashmir Government in 2010  The Department of Biotechnology (DBT) of the Government of India awarded him the National Bioscience Award for Career Development, one of the highest Indian science awards in 2014. Malik has been bestowed with several other international awards and fellowships in various conferences and workshops.

Selected bibliography

Research Articles

Books/Chapters

See also 

 Breast cancer
 Monarda citriodora

Notes

References

External links 
 

N-BIOS Prize recipients
Indian scientific authors
Living people
Indian medical academics
Scientists from Jammu and Kashmir
Year of birth missing (living people)
Indian pharmacologists
Indian biochemists